Harold Merritt (born July 28, 1951) is an American college basketball coach. He was the head coach at Northern Arizona University from 1990 to 1994.

References

1951 births
Living people
American men's basketball players
Albany Great Danes men's basketball players
American men's basketball coaches
New Orleans Privateers men's basketball coaches
Long Beach State Beach men's basketball coaches
Morris Brown Wolverines men's basketball coaches
Northern Arizona Lumberjacks men's basketball coaches